State Farm Stadium is a multi-purpose stadium in Glendale, Arizona, west of Phoenix. It is the home of the Arizona Cardinals of the National Football League (NFL) and the annual Fiesta Bowl. It replaced Sun Devil Stadium in Tempe as the home of the Cardinals, adjacent to Desert Diamond Arena, former home of the Arizona Coyotes of the National Hockey League.

The stadium has been the host of the Fiesta Bowl since 2007. It hosted two BCS National Championship games in 2007 and 2011 respectively. It hosted the College Football Playoff National Championship in 2016, three Super Bowls (2008, 2015, and 2023), as well as the Pro Bowl in 2015. For soccer, it was one of the stadiums for the 2015 CONCACAF Gold Cup also the first semi-final of the 2019 CONCACAF Gold Cup and the Copa América Centenario in 2016. For basketball, it hosted the NCAA Final Four in 2017, which is scheduled to return in 2024.

The stadium opened in 2006 as Cardinals Stadium. Later that year in September, the University of Phoenix acquired naming rights, renaming it University of Phoenix Stadium, in what was initially a 20-year agreement. The current name was announced in September 2018 and comes from insurance company State Farm, which has an 18-year naming rights deal.

History
Since moving to Arizona from St. Louis in 1988, the Cardinals had played at Sun Devil Stadium on the campus of Arizona State University in Tempe. The Cardinals planned to play there for only a few years, until a new stadium could be built in Phoenix. The savings and loan crisis derailed funding for a new stadium during the 1990s. Over time, the Cardinals expressed frustration at being merely tenants in a college football stadium. The lack of having their own stadium denied them additional revenue streams available to other NFL teams. The Cardinals campaigned several times in the years prior to its construction for a new and more modern facility.

The ceremonial groundbreaking for the new stadium in 2003 was held on April 12, and after three years of construction, the 63,400-seat venue opened on August 1, 2006. It was designed by Eisenman Architects and HOK Sport (now Populous). The stadium is considered an architectural icon for the region and was named by Business Week as one of the ten “most impressive” sports facilities on the globe due to the combination of its retractable roof (engineering design by Walter P Moore) and roll-in natural grass field, similar to the GelreDome and the Veltins-Arena.

LED video and ribbon displays from Daktronics in Brookings, South Dakota were installed in 2006 prior to Arizona's first game of the season at the new stadium.

The cost of the project was $455 million, which included $395.4 million for the stadium, $41.7 million for site improvements, and $17.8 million for the land. Contributors to the stadium included the Arizona Sports and Tourism Authority ($302.3 million), the Arizona Cardinals ($143.2 million), and the City of Glendale ($9.5 million).

The stadium has 88 luxury suites – called luxury lofts – with space for 16 future suites as the stadium matures.

The  surrounding the stadium is called Sportsman's Park (the team had previously played in a venue of the same name in St. Louis from 1960 to 1965). Included within the Park is an  landscaped tailgating area called the Great Lawn.

The stadium seating capacity can be expanded by 8,800 for "mega-events" such as college bowls, NFL Super Bowls, the NFC Championship Game, and the Final Four  by adding risers and ganged, portable "X-frame" folding seats. The end zone area on the side of the facility where the field tray rolls in and out of the facility can be expanded to accommodate an additional tier of seating which slopes down from the scoreboard level.

The roof is made out of translucent Birdair fabric and opens in 12 minutes. It is the first retractable roof ever built on an incline.

Events

Events held at the stadium include Arizona Cardinals home games; public grand opening tours held August 19–20, 2006 (attended by 120,000 people); various shows, expositions, tradeshows and motor sport events; the AIA 4A and 5A state championship games for football; and international soccer exhibition matches.

The multipurpose nature of the facility has allowed it to host 91 events representing 110 event days between the dates of August 4, 2006, through the BCS National Championship January 8, 2007.

NFL
The first preseason football game was played August 12, 2006, when the Cardinals defeated the Pittsburgh Steelers, 21–13. The first regular season game was played September 10 against the San Francisco 49ers (the Cardinals won 34–27). The stadium's air-conditioning system made it possible for the Cardinals to play at home on the opening weekend of the NFL season for the first time since moving to Arizona in 1988.

On October 16, 2006, the stadium hosted a notable game between the Cardinals and the undefeated Chicago Bears where the Bears came back from a 20-point deficit to defeat the Cardinals. The Bears would later go on to play in Super Bowl XLI.

University of Phoenix Stadium hosted Super Bowl XLII on February 3, 2008, in which the New York Giants defeated the previously undefeated New England Patriots 17–14 with a paid attendance crowd of 71,101. This was the second time the Phoenix area hosted a Super Bowl, the other being Super Bowl XXX held in nearby Tempe at Sun Devil Stadium in 1996 when the Dallas Cowboys defeated the Pittsburgh Steelers 27–17.

The Cardinals' first home playoff game since 1947 took place at the stadium on January 3, 2009, with Arizona beating the Atlanta Falcons, 30–24. The stadium also hosted the 2008 NFC Championship Game between the Cardinals and Philadelphia Eagles on January 18, 2009, which the Cardinals won 32–25 in front of over 70,000 fans in attendance and advanced to Super Bowl XLIII.

The 2015 Pro Bowl was the first Pro Bowl to be held at the same location as the same year's Super Bowl since 2010. The Pro Bowl returned to Hawaii in 2016. On February 1, 2015, the New England Patriots defeated the Seattle Seahawks 28–24 in Super Bowl XLIX held at the stadium.

On November 30, 2020, it was announced that because of Santa Clara County's new COVID-19 rules barring contact sports, the 49ers could not play at their home Levi's Stadium; the 49ers were subsequently forced to play their final three home games against the Buffalo Bills, the Washington Football Team, and the Seattle Seahawks at State Farm Stadium. Including the road game against the Cardinals, the 49ers played four straight games at State Farm Stadium to end the season.

Super Bowl LVII was held at the stadium on February 12, 2023, featuring the NFC Conference Champions, the Philadelphia Eagles, and the AFC Conference Champions, the Kansas City Chiefs. Rihanna performed during the halftime show. The Chiefs won the contest 38-35.

College football
The stadium was the new venue for the Fiesta Bowl since 2007, replacing Sun Devil Stadium. The first Fiesta Bowl at the stadium was held on January 1, 2007, featuring the Boise State Broncos vs. the University of Oklahoma Sooners, with Boise State winning 43-42 in overtime. It also hosted the BCS National Championship on January 8, 2007, between the (1) Ohio State Buckeyes and the (2) University of Florida Gators, which the Gators won 41–14.

On January 10, 2011, the stadium hosted the 2011 BCS National Championship Game between the Auburn Tigers and the Oregon Ducks, which had an attendance record setting 78,603 on hand for the game.

On January 11, 2016, University of Phoenix Stadium hosted the College Football Playoff National Championship Game featuring the No. 2 Alabama Crimson Tide and No. 1 ranked Clemson Tigers.

On December 31, 2022, as part of the College Football Playoff's semifinal games, State Farm Stadium hosted the 2022 Fiesta Bowl, featuring the No. 3 TCU Horned Frogs and No. 2 ranked Michigan Wolverines.

College basketball

Before 2018, the venue was known as University of Phoenix Stadium.  It hosted the Final Four, the semifinals and championship game of the NCAA Division I men's basketball tournament, in 2017, and will do so again in 2024.

Soccer

On February 7, 2007, the stadium hosted a soccer match attended by 62,462 fans. The United States men's national soccer team defeated Mexico, 2–0. On January 21, 2012, the U.S. played against Venezuela and won the match 1–0.

On January 30, 2013, Mexico played against Denmark, a game that was broadcast on Televisa Deportes, UniMás, and TV Azteca. The match ended in a 1–1 draw.

On November 19, 2015, the stadium was one of the sites selected for the 2016 Copa América Centenario. The stadium hosted three matches, including Mexico vs. Uruguay on June 5, and the third-place match (United States vs. Colombia) on June 25.

In club soccer, Real Madrid battled MLS side LA Galaxy in August 2013. The Spanish side defeated the Galaxy 3–1.

The stadium has hosted the CONCACAF Gold Cup and the first semi-final of the 2019 Gold Cup.

WrestleMania

The stadium hosted the WWE professional wrestling event WrestleMania XXVI which took place on March 28, 2010, with 72,219 fans in attendance. This was the first WrestleMania since WrestleMania XI with a non-title match as a main event, the first WrestleMania to be held in the state of Arizona and the third to be held in an open-air venue, after WrestleMania IX and WrestleMania XXIV. The event grossed $5.8 million in ticket sales, making the event the highest grossing and attended entertainment event held at the University of Phoenix Stadium.

Concerts

Other events
The stadium has also hosted other events, including the Fiesta Bowl National Band Championship High School Marching Band competition and several high school graduations.

On August 1, 2009, the stadium hosted Monster Jam Summer Heat, with Maximum Destruction defeating Captain's Curse in the racing finals and Grave Digger winning the freestyle event.

The stadium hosted the inaugural Stadium Super Trucks race on April 6, 2013.

On January 30, 2016, Monster Jam returned to the stadium for the first time since 2009, with 16 of the best trucks. On February 6, the AMA Supercross Championship raced for the first time, after visiting Chase Field from 1999 to 2015.

On February 10, 2019 Russell M. Nelson, President of the Church of Jesus Christ of Latter-day Saints, spoke to an audience of 68,000, a capacity larger than many events due to the majority of the field space being filled with seats.

On January 11, 2021, the stadium began to be used for administering COVID-19 vaccines 24/7, averaging 7,000 vaccinations per day with the assistance of 500 volunteers.

Naming rights

On September 26, 2006, the University of Phoenix acquired the naming rights to the stadium totalling $154.5 million over 20 years. On April 11, 2017, the University of Phoenix terminated the naming rights just over halfway into the 20-year deal, citing financial woes. The university kept its name on the stadium until a replacement sponsor was found.  On September 4, 2018, State Farm reached a deal securing the rights through 2036. University of Phoenix will remain involved as a sponsor with the team in a reduced capacity as the Cardinals' "official education partner."

Parking space 
The stadium has approximately 14,000 on-site parking spaces (plus 12,000 adjacent spaces), located in numerous lots that surround the stadium's 2,000 disabled parking spaces. The design improvement, featured for example in a Discovery program about this stadium, is zoning. Parking spaces for guests are zoned with preferred leaving directions, to achieve the fastest possible movement of traffic.

References

External links

 
 Arizona Cardinals' website for stadium
 Global Spectrum’s website for stadium
 Arizona Sports and Tourism Authority
 University of Phoenix Stadium Seating Chart

2006 establishments in Arizona
Arizona Cardinals stadiums
NCAA bowl game venues
Sports venues completed in 2006
National Football League venues
American football venues in Arizona
Retractable-pitch stadiums
Retractable-roof stadiums in the United States
Soccer venues in Arizona
CONCACAF Gold Cup stadiums
Fiesta Bowl
Sports in Glendale, Arizona
Buildings and structures in Glendale, Arizona
Peter Eisenman buildings and structures
State Farm
NCAA Division I men's basketball tournament Final Four venues